"Seventeen" is a single released by the American rock band Winger, from their album Winger. Released in 1989, the song charted at No. 26 on the Billboard Hot 100. 

The B-side for this single was the album cut "Hangin' On".

The song was named the 87th best hard rock song of all time by VH1.

Background

According to Kip Winger, he took inspiration from the Beatles song, "I Saw Her Standing There", which contains the lyric, "Well she was just seventeen / If you know what I mean / And the way she looked / Was way beyond compare" and that he wasn't aware that it was illegal for an adult to have sexual relations with a seventeen-year-old.

Winger said guitarist Reb Beach wrote the main riff when he was about 15, but was unsure how to use it. However, Winger had an idea, and wove it into the song. He said they were trying to rip off a Led Zeppelin song with "weird syncopation" on the verse, though he cannot remember which song it was anymore — probably "The Crunge" or "Walter's Walk". He also stated, "The thing I like about 'Seventeen' is that time and time again I've seen cover bands try to play it and there's no one I've ever seen be able to play that riff correctly. That song is very deceiving because it's cocky on the melody end and it's musically a difficult song for average bands to play, because it's all this intricate picking and a lot of riffs and syncopations and singing and playing that song has always been a challenge."

Track listing
7" and cassette single

Canadian 7" single

CD single

Charts

See also
List of glam metal albums and songs

References

Songs about teenagers
Winger (band) songs
1988 songs
Song recordings produced by Beau Hill
Songs written by Kip Winger
Songs written by Beau Hill
1989 singles
Atlantic Records singles
Songs written by Reb Beach